Baldassare de Benavente, O. de M. (1 March 1638 – 30 October 1687) was a Roman Catholic prelate who served as Bishop of Potenza (1686–1687).

Biography
Baldassare de Benavente was born in Salamanca, Spain on 1 March 1638 and ordained a priest in the Order of the Blessed Virgin Mary of Mercy. On 12 December 1685, he was selected as Bishop of Potenza and confirmed by Pope Innocent XI on 13 May 1686. On 19 May 1686, he was consecrated bishop by Alessandro Crescenzi (cardinal), Cardinal-Priest of Santa Prisca, with Pier Antonio Capobianco, Bishop Emeritus of Lacedonia, and Francesco Onofrio Hodierna, Bishop of Bitetto, serving as co-consecrators. He served as Bishop of Potenza until his death on 30 October 1687.

References

External links and additional sources
 (for Chronology of Bishops) 
 (for Chronology of Bishops)  

17th-century Italian Roman Catholic bishops
Bishops appointed by Pope Innocent XI
1638 births
1687 deaths
People from Salamanca
Mercedarian bishops